Rabbit Hole is a 2010 American drama film directed by John Cameron Mitchell and written by David Lindsay-Abaire, based on his 2006 play of the same name. The film stars Nicole Kidman (who also co-produced) and Aaron Eckhart as a grieving couple coping with the death of their four-year-old son. It also stars Dianne Wiest, Tammy Blanchard, Miles Teller (in his feature film debut), Giancarlo Esposito, Jon Tenney, and Sandra Oh.

Rabbit Hole had its world premiere at the 35th Toronto International Film Festival on September 13, 2010. The film received a limited theatrical release in the United States on December 17, 2010, before a wide release on January 28, 2011, by Lionsgate Films. Kidman's performance was critically acclaimed and earned her nominations for an Academy Award, a Critics' Choice Movie Award, a Golden Globe Award, and a Screen Actors Guild Award, among other accolades.

Plot
Rebecca "Becca" Corbett and Howard "Howie" Corbett's four-year-old son Danny is killed in a car accident after he runs out into the street after his dog. Eight months on, Becca wants to give away Danny's clothes, remove Danny's things, and sell their house. Howie is angry at Becca's elimination of anything that reminds them of their child. Becca assumes Howie wants to have another child, but she refuses.

Becca's mother, Nat, has also lost a son, Arthur (Becca's brother), who died of a drug overdose in his 30s. Becca states the two deaths are different situations, and thus not comparable. Becca's sister Izzy is pregnant, and Becca keeps giving Izzy passive-aggressive advice about becoming a mother, which Izzy resents.

Becca and Howie attend group therapy, where Becca is irritated by some of the other members – particularly by one couple who attribute their own child's death to "God's will". Becca stops going to group, while Howie continues to attend the meetings without Becca. Meanwhile, long-time member Gabby starts coming to group alone, telling Howie that her husband also refuses to come to group therapy. One night before group he sees her high in her car, and asks to join her. They both start smoking pot in her car before the group therapy meetings. Eventually, they ditch meetings in favour of going to do things like bowling, where they almost begin an affair. However, Howie pulls away, stating that he is in love with his wife.

Meanwhile, Becca starts meeting with Jason, the teenage driver of the car that hit Danny. She discovers he feels guilty and tells him she does not blame him for the accident. Jason tells her about a comic book he is writing called Rabbit Hole, which is about parallel universes. She asks to see it, and he tells her that she can see it when he is finished.

Becca and Howie put their house on the market. The day of the open house, Howie decides to stay at the home for it. During the open house, he is in Danny's bedroom with an interested couple, who ask about his son. He tells them that his son died and they react awkwardly. After the open house, Jason brings his finished comic book to Becca and walks in unannounced through the door, which is still open from the open house. As Jason gives Becca the book, Howie realises who he is and gets angry. Becca tells Howie she has been meeting Jason. Howie is angered by this and demands that Jason leave immediately. Jason complies.

Becca and Jason meet again, and talk about the content of the comic book – parallel lives. She realises that at this moment, she is living her "sad" self. There are many other versions of her that exist in other ways, and are not consumed by grief. Howie and Becca begin to have new activities, such as bowling and playing games, and they start to accept their son's death. Becca also comes to realize that her grief is like her own mother's, in that it will never stop.

Howie and Becca decide to have a garden lunch. The scene begins with Howie telling Becca how the lunch would take place, subtly and incrementally interacting with a small group of trusted friends while life begins to feel normal again. Simultaneously, the screen fades into the lunch as Howie continues to speak in the background. The film ends with Becca and Howie sitting in their garden alone, after all their guests have left, staring into space. Becca reaches out to Howie and touches his hand. They hold hands affectionately as they continue to sit and stare into space.

Cast

Production
Rabbit Hole was filmed primarily in the Bayside neighborhood of the borough of Queens, New York City. The $3.2 million production had a 28-day shoot.

Due to a scheduling conflict, Kidman declined a role in Woody Allen's You Will Meet a Tall Dark Stranger, in favor of this film. In a 2014 interview on The Howard Stern Show, Eckhart said that he researched his role by pretending in a support group to have lost a child.

Owen Pallett was initially scheduled to compose the score, but then Abel Korzeniowski was announced. Ultimately, the position went to Anton Sanko.

Release
Rabbit Hole premiered at the 2010 Toronto International Film Festival in September 2010, then played at three other film festivals (Mill Valley Film Festival in October, and both Denver Film Festival, and Rome Film Festival in November). The film opened in Canada and the United States on December 17, 2010 in a limited release in 5 theaters and grossed $53,778 averaging $10,756 per theater and ranking 38th at the box office. The widest release domestically for the film was 131 theaters and it ended up earning $2,229,058 in the U.S. and  $2,914,096 internationally for a total of $5,143,154.

Reception
Rabbit Hole received positive reviews and has a rating of 87% on Rotten Tomatoes based on 201 reviews with an average score of 7.60/10. The consensus states "It's often painful to watch, but Rabbit Hole's finely written script and convincing performances make it worth the effort." The film also has a score of 76 out of 100 on Metacritic based on 39 reviews.

Festival and other advance showings of the film garnered good reviews, particularly for Kidman and Wiest. The film received a standing ovation at the 2010 Toronto International Film Festival. Kirk Honeycutt of The Hollywood Reporter said, "Kidman grabs the central focus of the story as the more distraught of the two. The performance is riveting because she essentially plays the entire film at two levels, the surface everyday life and then what is turning over and over again in her mind." Peter Debruge of Variety found it "a refreshingly positive-minded take on cinema's ultimate downer: overcoming the death of a child", and called it "[a]adroitly expanded" from the stage play, "with Nicole Kidman and Aaron Eckhart delivering expert, understated performances". Roger Ebert gave it 3.5 stars out of 4, calling it "... entertaining and surprisingly amusing, under the circumstances. The film is in a better state of mind than its characters. Its humor comes, as the best humor does, from an acute observation of human nature. We have known people something like this. We smile in recognition. Apart from anything else, "Rabbit Hole" is a technical challenge. It is simple enough to cover the events in the story, not so simple to modulate them for humor and even warmth. I knew what the movie would be about, but I was impressed by how it was about it."

Richard Corliss of Time magazine named it one of the Top 10 Movies of 2010.

Differences from the play
The play has a cast of five roles, while a few other characters such as Gabby are only mentioned in dialogue. In contrast, the film has a cast of over a dozen actors. While the entire play takes place in the home of Becca and Howie, the film has a variety of locations. Past incidents, such as Becca's bad experience in the grief support group, are referred to in the play's dialogue but are depicted on screen in the film. The videos that Howie obsesses over are actually seen in the film, though not in the play. The two subplots of Howie's relationship with a woman from the grief support group and Becca's relationship with Jason, the driver of the car that hit Danny, have both been expanded. The film also adds new characters who do not appear in the play: sister Izzy's boyfriend and Howie's best friend.

Jason is an aspiring science fiction writer in the play, but an aspiring comic book artist in the film.

In the opinion of critic Jim Lane, the film is more focused on the husband and wife and less of an ensemble piece. Lane writes 
On stage, Rabbit Hole is a tightly focused five-character drama punctuated with sharp, surprising flashes of aching humor. In the movie, however, supporting roles are trimmed into near irrelevance, elbowed into the background by the spotlight focused on Becca and Howie—or, more bluntly, on Nicole Kidman and Aaron Eckhart.

Here’s what David Lindsay-Abaire seems not to understand about his own play: It’s like an atom in which the five characters are electrons revolving around the missing nucleus that was Danny.... Without their nucleus, these electrons wobble and flail in their orbits, by turns clutching at and repelling one another.... In the movie, Rabbit Hole’s symmetrical stage design is torn between the age-old pitfall of “opening up” a play and the Hollywood urge to focus on Kidman and Eckhart (who are, after all, the stars).....The movie orbits Becca and Howie instead of the lost Danny.

The director of a 2010 stage production of Rabbit Hole, Robert A. Norman, declared, "The 2010 movie version starring Nicole Kidman lacked the humor and hopefulness of the stage script. Our production will have plenty of both of those things." However, Abaire, who wrote both the stage play and screenplay, believes, "For the film, we cut so much that worked in the play that I worried we had cut all the laughs. But there were all these other laughs I didn't know were there."

Accolades
Wins
Denver Film Festival Excellence in Acting Awards – Aaron Eckhart
Heartland Film Festival Truly Moving Picture Award – Nicole Kidman and Per Saari

Nominations
Academy Award for Best Actress – Nicole Kidman
Alliance of Women Film Journalists Award for Best Actress – Nicole Kidman
Alliance of Women Film Journalists Award for Best Adapted Screenplay – David Lindsay-Abaire
Broadcast Film Critics Association Award for Best Actress – Nicole Kidman
Chicago Film Critics Association Award for Best Screenplay – David Lindsay-Abaire
Dallas-Fort Worth Film Critics Association Award for Best Actress – Nicole Kidman
Detroit Film Critics Society Award for Best Actress – Nicole Kidman
Golden Globe Award for Best Actress – Motion Picture Drama – Nicole Kidman
Houston Film Critics Society Award for Best Actress – Nicole Kidman
Independent Spirit Award for Best Director – John Cameron Mitchell
Independent Spirit Award for Best Female Lead – Nicole Kidman
Independent Spirit Award for Best Male Lead – Aaron Eckhart
Independent Spirit Award for Best Screenplay – David Lindsay-Abaire
Italian Online Movie Award for Best Actress – Nicole Kidman
Las Vegas Film Critics Society Award for Best Actress – Nicole Kidman
Online Film Critics Society Award for Best Actress – Nicole Kidman
San Diego Film Critics Society Award for Best Actor – Aaron Eckhart
Satellite Award for Best Actress – Motion Picture Drama – Nicole Kidman
Satellite Award for Best Supporting Actress – Motion Picture – Dianne Wiest
Screen Actors Guild Award for Outstanding Performance by a Female Actor in a Leading Role – Motion Picture – Nicole Kidman
St. Louis Gateway Film Critics Association Award for Best Actress – Nicole Kidman
Utah Film Critics Association Award for Best Actress – Nicole Kidman
Washington D.C. Area Film Critics Association Award for Best Actress – Nicole Kidman

See also
 Rabbit Hole (Play)
 Dream House
 Talaash

References

External links

2010 films
2010 drama films
2010 independent films
2010s American films
2010s English-language films
American drama films
American films based on plays
American independent films
Films about dysfunctional families
Films about grieving
Films directed by John Cameron Mitchell
Films produced by Nicole Kidman
Films scored by Anton Sanko
Films set in New York (state)
Films shot in New York City
Films with screenplays by David Lindsay-Abaire
Lionsgate films
Odd Lot Entertainment films